Acephate is an organophosphate foliar and soil insecticide of moderate persistence with residual systemic activity of about 10–15 days at the recommended use rate. It is used primarily for control of aphids, including resistant species, in vegetables (e.g. potatoes, carrots, greenhouse tomatoes, and lettuce) and in horticulture (e.g. on roses and greenhouse ornamentals). It also controls leaf miners, caterpillars, sawflies, thrips, and spider mites in the previously stated crops as well as turf, and forestry. By direct application to mounds, it is effective in destroying imported fire ants.

Acephate is sold as a soluble powder, as emulsifiable concentrates, as pressurized aerosol, and in tree injection systems and granular formulations.

As of 2012, the EPA no longer allows the usage of acephate on green beans grown in the United States.

Toxicology
It is considered non-phytotoxic on many crop plants. Acephate and its primary metabolite, methamidophos, are toxic to Heliothis spp. that are considered resistant to other organophosphate insecticides. Acephate emits toxic fumes of various oxides of phosphorus, nitrogen, and sulfur when heated to decomposition. Symptoms of exposure to acephate include a slight irritation of eyes and skin.

The U.S. annually uses 4–5 million pounds of acephate. The author of one book states that acephate throws off the navigation systems of white-throated sparrows and other songbirds, making them unable to tell north from south.

References 

 U.S. EPA Office of Pesticide Programs. 
 Extension Toxicology Network. Pesticide Information Profiles. 
 Cooperative Extension Offices of Cornell University, Oregon State University, the University of Idaho, and the University of California at Davis. 
 Institute for Environmental Toxicology, Michigan State University.

External links 
 Acephate General Fact Sheet - National Pesticide Information Center
 Acephate Pesticide Information Profile - Extension Toxicology Network
 EPA Acephate Reregistration Eligibility Decision
 
 Lepitect - Soil injected Pesticide for Ornamental Use

Acetylcholinesterase inhibitors
Pesticides
Phosphoramidothioates
Leaf miners